The 2021 Amstel Gold Race was a road cycling one-day race that took place on 18 April 2021 in the Netherlands. It was the 55th edition of the Amstel Gold Race and the 14th event of the 2021 UCI World Tour. Although Wout van Aert was declared to have defeated Tom Pidcock in a photofinish sprint with Maximilian Schachmann completing the podium, it was speculated that the photofinish camera had been focused on a point approximately 26.86 cm forward of the true finish line, making the true victor unclear.

Teams
Twenty-five teams were invited to the race, including all nineteen UCI WorldTeams and six UCI ProTeams.

UCI WorldTeams

 
 
 
 
 
 
 
 
 
 
 
 
 
 
 
 
 
 
 

UCI ProTeams

Result

References

2021 in Dutch sport
2021 UCI World Tour
April 2021 sports events in the Netherlands
Amstel Gold Race